Zephyranthes macrosiphon is a species of flowering plant in the family Amaryllidaceae, native to northeastern and southwestern Mexico. It was first described by John Gilbert Baker in 1881.

References

macrosiphon
Flora of Northeastern Mexico
Flora of Southwestern Mexico
Plants described in 1881